This is a list consisting of current, upcoming and former broadcasts by the Indian television channel Zee Keralam.

Current broadcasts

Soap operas

Dubbed series

Reality shows

Former broadcasts

Soap operas

Dubbed series

Reality shows

Malayalam-language television channels
Lists of television series by network